America's sweetheart may refer to:

America's Sweetheart (Courtney Love album), 2004
America's Sweetheart (musical), a Rodgers and Hart musical
America's Sweethearts, a 2001 film
"America's Sweetheart" (song), a song from the Elle King album Love Stuff
  America's Sweetheart (Chanel West Coast album), 2020
 A reference to Canadian-born actress Mary Pickford
 A reference to Debbie Reynolds